Travis Milne (born July 18, 1986) is a Canadian actor, best known for portraying Officer Chris Diaz in the drama series Rookie Blue.

Life and career
Milne is from Lac La Biche, Alberta.  He was a student in J.A.Williams High School, in Lac La Biche. He was convinced by his drama teacher to pursue a career in acting.  Once he pursued this career, he fell in love with acting and found an agent in Calgary, Alberta.

After starring in a few short films Milne was cast in 2007 as a co-host of My Green House, a television series on the environmentally friendly lifestyle.  My Green House was shown on CTV Two Alberta and on Ion Television and Live Well Network in the United States.

He has also appeared in the television series Bionic Woman, the television movies Confessions of a Go-Go Girl and Holiday in Handcuffs, and in the film Leslie, My Name is Evil, which premiered at the 2009 Toronto International Film Festival.

On July 20, 2009, it was announced that Milne had been cast as a principal cast member in the Canadian police drama series Rookie Blue, which aired on Global and in the United States on ABC.

He is also a voice actor, notable for being the new voice actor of Kamille Bidan, the protagonist of Mobile Suit Zeta Gundam, replacing Jonathan Lachlan-Stewart in the Dynasty Warriors: Gundam games.

Filmography

Television

Film

Voice Acting
 Dynasty Warriors: Gundam - Kamille Bidan
 Dynasty Warriors: Gundam 2 - Kamille Bidan

References

External links
 

Living people
Canadian male film actors
Canadian male television actors
Male actors from Alberta
People from Lac La Biche County
21st-century Canadian male actors
1986 births